The Arellano University Institute of Allied Medical Services is the school of the university that specializes in physical therapy. It offers the courses of Bachelor of Science in Physical Therapy and Bachelor of Science in Medical Technology/ Medical Laboratory Science. To date, the Medical Technology course was separated into its own program.

Citations

Footnotes

External links

 Arellano University - Official website
 Arellano University - Institute of Allied Medical Services - Official website

Arellano University